Futuro Forestal S.A.  is a German-Panamanian reforestation company that operates in Latin America. It was founded in 1994 in Panama and is headquartered in Panama City. Futuro Forestal is the first impact investment management company in the tropical forestry industry. To date, the company has planted over 8,000 hectares of teak and mixed hardwood plantations on deforested pastureland, often under the Forest Stewardship Council (FSC) standard.

History 

Futuro Forestal was founded in 1994 by Andreas Eke and Iliana Armién. Since that time, the company developed from a small retail investment to a timber investment management organization to an impact forestry company with up to 2,500 employees.
 
 1994: Futuro Forestal started its first reforestation, called "Projecto Madera Fina" (Engl.: fine timber project), with 9 hectares in Panama.
 1998: As first company in Panama, Futuro Forestal applies to FSC-standard. 
 1998: Futuro Forestal transferred as first company worldwide a Business-to-business-transaction from reforestation to Carbon credit market.
 2001: Opening of new offices and a nursery in Las Lajas, Chiriquí, Panama.
 2003 & 2004: The reforestations of Futuro Forestal were rated as Latin America's best forest investment by rating agency SICIREC (abbr., span.: Sistemas de Circulación Ecológica, engl.: systems of ecological cycles).
 2005: Futuro Forestal brings its first shipment of FSC-certified timber to the market. Referring to Jagwood+, the sale of timber from teak and yellow cedar brought a significantly higher price (US $120/m3) than "[...] uncertified thinning wood (normally around 50-70 US$)" .
 2006: Metafore Innovation Award for Futuro Forestal's "[...] WoodStockInvest program, which offers worldwide investors the opportunity to own a forest, invest in a high yield product and contribute to social and ecological development in Central America".
 2006/2007:Futuro Forestal expanded its operations to Nicaragua and started a reforestation program in cooperation with the United Nations Framework Convention on Climate Change (UNFCCC). 
 2008: Futuro Forestal sold its retail-investment reforestations to its long-term sub-contractor Forest Finance. According to Forest Finance the reforestation-areas of Futuro Forestal brought significantly higher payoff than expected in revenue forecasts.
 2009: German Investment Corporation (German: Deutsche Investitions- und Entwicklungsgesellschaft, abbr.: DEG) and Futuro Forestal started an environmental education initiative for primary schools in Nicaragua.
 2011: The Company decided to refocus its efforts as an impact investment management company. To make it transparent to its stakeholders, Futuro Forestal reaffirmed its support of the Ten Principles of the United Nations Global Compact.
 2012: The Global Exchange for Social Investment (GEXSI) and Futuro Forestal established a strategic partnership. Through it, Futuro Forestal's experience and methodology will be adopted for an upcoming timber-project in Madagascar.

Services
Futuro Forestal provides sustainable reforestation services including timber investment management, eco system restoration, Corporate Social Responsibility (CSR) project execution,  and social services like education for rural communities.

Timber investment 
Futuro Forestal developed plantations where native hardwood species like Roble Coral (Amazonia terminalia), Cocobolo (Dalbergia retusa) and Zapatero (Hiernonyma alchorneoides) are planted according to site-specific soil conditions.  The philosophy was also applied to exotic teak (Tectona grandis). This helps optimize soil conditions and creates multi-faceted habitats for wildlife, particularly when  compared to monoculture plantations. In Futuro Forestal's plantations, a significant percentage of the land areas is allocated to environmental protection. Furthermore, "[...] the company has been the first to sell carbon credits from reforestation as a business in Panamá" (Montagnini 2005, p. 181).

Ecosystem restoration 

Ecosystem restoration is the return of a damaged ecological system to a stable, healthy, and sustainable state. Futuro Forestal was awarded an important mitigation project for Minera Panama. The 7,000+ hectare project aims to:

 Restore degraded land using angiosperms and pioneer species, 
 Establish species natural to the area, 
 Optimize ratio and distribution of species used, 
 Promote wildlife function through the establishment of trees with food functions, and 
 Provide significant biodiversity with the support of experimental nurseries with native species.

CSR project execution 
In view of CSR projects is solely the sustainability of reforestation's social and environmental impact.

Education 
Together with Nicaraguan Federal Ministry for Economic Cooperation and Development, Futuro Forestal started environmental education in forest-dependent communities. Children are educated in primary schools and adults get theoretical knowledge about agroforestry, like sheep-farming with Pelibüeys and beekeeping. Practical development is generated through microcredits for sheep and beehives.

Scientific cooperation 
In 2001 Futuro Forestal, the Native Species Reforestation Project of the Yale University's School of Forestry and Environmental Studies & the Smithsonian Tropical Research Institute conducted a native species project in Panama. Through this, the partners researched native species silvicultural and practical application of forest management techniques.

Subsidiary
Forest & Community Foundation (nonprofit)

References

Notes

Further reading

External links 
 

Forestry in Central America
Sustainable forest management
Reforestation
Companies based in Panama City
Renewable resource companies established in 1994
1994 establishments in Panama